Bernd Siebert (born 17 October 1949) is a German politician. Born in Gudensberg, Hesse, he represents the CDU. Bernd Siebert has served as a member of the Bundestag from the state of Hesse from 1994 till 2009, from 2010 till 2017 and since 2020.

Life 
He moved up to the Bundestag on 2 March 2020. He is a member of the defense committee.

References

External links 

 Bundestag biography 

1949 births
Living people
Members of the Bundestag for Hesse
Members of the Bundestag 2017–2021
Members of the Bundestag 2013–2017
Members of the Bundestag 2009–2013
Members of the Bundestag 2005–2009
Members of the Bundestag 2002–2005
Members of the Bundestag 1998–2002
Members of the Bundestag 1994–1998
Members of the Bundestag for the Christian Democratic Union of Germany